Arang Kel is a village and tourist spot in the Neelam valley of Azad Kashmir.

Gallery

See also 
Taobat
Sharda
Keran
Kutton
Athmuqam

References

2005 Kashmir earthquake
Populated places in Neelam District
Tourist attractions in Azad Kashmir
Ski areas and resorts in Pakistan